Karavansaray or Karavansarai may refer to:

 Ijevan, Armenia, a town formerly known as Karavansarai
 Caravanserai, a roadside inn

See also
 Karvansara (disambiguation)
 Karvansara-ye Olya
 Karvansara-ye Sofla